Acabanga is a genus of longhorn beetles of the subfamily Lamiinae, containing the following species:

 Acabanga nigrohumeralis (Tippmann, 1960)
 Acabanga pinima Martins & Galileo, 1991

References

Hemilophini
Cerambycidae genera